= Klanting =

Traditional Indonesian dish

Klanting is one of the traditional dishes of the Javanese people. Klanting is made from corn starch, giving the food a rubber-like texture similar to agar-agar. It comes in a variety of colors, including red and green. Being tasteless, Klanting is traditionally sprinkled with grated coconut and sugar merah. Klanting is often found in traditional markets such as the Pasar Legi in Jombang.
